A list of films produced in Argentina in 1973:

External links and references
 Argentine films of 1973 at the Internet Movie Database

1973
Films
Argentine